Scleria mikawana is a plant in the family Cyperaceae. It grows as a tall, slender annual sedge.

Description

Distribution and habitat
Scleria mikawana grows widely in tropical Africa, South Asia, Japan, China, Indochina, Malesia and Australia. Its habitat is wet grassy locales and swamps.

References

mikawana
Flora of Africa
Flora of the Indian subcontinent
Flora of Japan
Flora of Yunnan
Flora of Indo-China
Flora of Malesia
Flora of the Northern Territory
Plants described in 1913